Dario Dussin (born 13 April 1989 Switzerland) is a Swiss professional footballer who currently plays as a defender for FC Biel-Bienne in the Swiss Challenge League.

External links
Player profile at soccerway.com

1989 births
Living people
Swiss men's footballers
Association football midfielders
FC Wohlen players
FC Biel-Bienne players